The African Women's Volleyball Championship is a sport competition for national teams, currently held biannually and organized by the African Volleyball Confederation, the Africa volleyball federation.

Summary

Medal summary

Participating nations

See also

 Men's African Volleyball Championship
 Volleyball at the African Games
 Women's U23 African Volleyball Championship
 Women's Africa Volleyball Championship U20
 Girls' Africa Volleyball Championship U18

References

External links
 African Volleyball Championship (todor66.com)

 

African championship
African championship
Recurring sporting events established in 1976
African championships
Biennial sporting events
Volleyball competitions in Africa